Poonamallee taluk is a taluk in Chennai City of Tiruvallur district of the Indian state of Tamil Nadu. The headquarters of the taluk is the town of Poonamallee.

Demographics
According to the 2011 census, the taluk of Poonamallee had a population of 652,904 with 330,000  males and 322,904 females. There were 978 women for every 1000 men. The taluk had a literacy rate of 78.89. Child population in the age group below 6 was 33,158 Males and 31,973 Females.

References 

Taluks of Tiruvallur district